This article contains information about the literary events and publications of 1652.

Events
March/April – John Milton loses the last of his eyesight during the year.
unknown date – A translation by Saiyid Aidarus of the Arabic religious poem "Hamziya" is the earliest known written example of Swahili literature.

New books

Prose
Anonymous – Eliza's Babes, or the Virgin's Offering
Elias Ashmole – Theatrum Chemicum Britannicum.
Nicholas Culpepper – The English Physitian, or, An astrologo-physical discourse on the vulgar herbs of this nation, being a compleat method of physick, whereby a man may preserve his body in health, or cure himself, being sick (later known as The Complete Herbal)
Owen Feltham – Brief Character of the Low Countries
Antonio Rocco – L'Alcibiade, fanciullo a scola (Alcibiades the schoolboy)
Thomas Urquhart – The Jewel (Ekskybalauron): a vindication of the honor of Scotland
Henry Vaughan – Mount of Olives
Thomas Vaughan (philosopher) (Eugenius Philalethes) – The Fame and Confession of the Fraternity of R:C:
Gerrard Winstanley – The Law of Freedom

Drama
Anonymous – The Bastard
Richard Brome – A Jovial Crew
Francis Goldsmith – Sophompaneas, or Joseph (a translation of Hugo Grotius's tragedy)
Thomas Middleton – The Widow
John Tatham – The Scots Figgaries
Pedro Calderon de la Barca – La fiera, el rayo y la piedra
Agustín Moreto
San Franco de Siena
El parecido en la corte
Luis Velez de Guevara – Reinar después de morir
François le Métel de Boisrobert – Les Trois Orontes

Poetry
Edward Benlowes – Theophilia or Love's Sacrifice
Richard Crashaw – Deo Nostro Te Decet Hymnus
Antonio Enríquez Gómez – Sansón Nazareno
Francisco de Trillo y Figueroa – Poesías varias, heroicas, satíricas y amorosas

Births
March 2 – Thomas Otway, English dramatist (died 1685)
April 13 – Thomas Ward, English Catholic writer (died 1708)
May – Jane Barker, English poet and dramatist (died 1732)
Unknown date – Nahum Tate, Irish poet and dramatist (died 1715)

Deaths
February 28 – Arcangela Tarabotti, Venetian nun and feminist writer (born 1604)
April 12 – John Vicars, English contemporary biographer, poet and polemicist of the English Civil War (born 1582)
May – Claude de L'Estoile, French playwright and poet (born 1602)
May 5 – Mary (née Powell), English wife of John Milton (born 1625)
June 25 – Abraham von Franckenberg, German mystic, poet, and hymn writer (born 1593)
August 14 – Abraham Elzevir, Dutch printer, proprietor of the House of Elzevir (born 1592)
October – Arthur Wilson, English playwright, historian, and poet (born 1595)
October 8 – John Greaves, English antiquary (born 1602)
October 20 – Antonio Coello, Spanish dramatist and poet (born 1611)
November 29 – Francesco Angeloni, Italian historian, novelist, dramatist and collector (born 1587)
December 2 – Christopher Elderfield, English theologian (born 1607)
December 23 – John Cotton, English-born American theologian and minister (born 1585)

References

 
Years of the 17th century in literature